William L. Moran (October 10, 1869 – April 8, 1916) was a catcher and left fielder in Major League Baseball who played in part of two seasons in the National League. He was from Joliet, Illinois, near Chicago, and was the younger brother of Julie Moran
Wyman, a famous opera singer of the day.

See also
Loraine Wyman—his brush with the law while attempting to help his sister in a custody dispute

Notes

External links

Major League Baseball catchers
Major League Baseball left fielders
Chicago Colts players
St. Louis Browns (NL) players
Baseball players from Illinois
Sportspeople from Joliet, Illinois
1869 births
1916 deaths
19th-century baseball players
Omaha Omahogs players
Omaha Lambs players
Joliet Giants players
Lewiston (minor league baseball) players
Atlanta Windjammers players
Grand Rapids Gold Bugs players
Milwaukee Brewers (minor league) players
Minneapolis Millers (baseball) players